Francisco Guaragna Rigonat (born 7 February 1997) is an Argentine sailor. He competed in the Laser event at the 2020 Summer Olympics.

Notes

References

External links
 
 
 
 

1997 births
Living people
Argentine male sailors (sport)
Olympic sailors of Argentina
Sailors at the 2020 Summer Olympics – Laser
People from General López Department
Sportspeople from Santa Fe Province
21st-century Argentine people